Sebt Ennabour is a small town and rural commune in Sidi Ifni Province of the Guelmim-Oued Noun region of Morocco. At the time of the 2004 census, the commune had a total population of 8329 people living in 1350 households.

References

Populated places in Sidi Ifni Province
Rural communes of Guelmim-Oued Noun